Tawa Reservoir is a reservoir on the Tawa River in central India. It is located in Itarsi  of Narmadapuram District of Madhya Pradesh state, above Betul district. The reservoir was formed by the construction of the Tawa Dam, which began in 1958 and was completed in 1978. The dam provides for irrigation to several thousand hectares of farming land in Narmadapuram and Harda districts. It is also a big tourist attraction during the monsoon months. A cruise boat service has been started by the tourism department for visitors to the dam and reservoir.

Tawa Reservoir forms the western boundary of Satpura National Park and Bori Wildlife Sanctuary.

Power plant details
It is a small hydropower plant which was set up on the left bank to utilize the tailrace water for irrigation purpose.

It is a private sector hydro-electric generation power plant. The two units of 2 × 6.75 MW were set up by LNJ Bhilwara group. The generated power is supplied to HEG Plant Mandideep via MPPTCL Power Line.

The power production in this plant was started in 1998.

The construction of project was completed in record time of 22 months and at a cost of about 65 crore. The early and efficient completion of this dam was made possible by RSWI, Canada.

07572272803   seems to be (Not verified) the official Government landline for any queries related to the Tawa Dam.
For any criminal queries (not verified) regarding the Tawa Dam, contact the nearest police station at 07572272880 (not verified).

Technical details

It is a canal head project. Catchment area spreads over approximately 6000 km2.
Head range 7 to 21 m and discharge varying from 25 to 54 Cumecs.

Two turbo generators 6.75 MW rated capacity (20% over load).

Machinery and Equipment
 Vertical shaft kaplan turbines and auxiliaries
 11 kV semi umbrella synchronous generator and auxiliaries
 33 kV vacuum circuit breakers.
 1 MV 33 kV / 415 V auxiliary transformer
 Fire protection system
 110 DC with battery backup

History
The Tawa Dam had been built the Madya Pradesh Govt on the Tawa river in the 1970s to ensure enough water supply and hydropower to millions of people in the state. The dam was made under the leadership of late Shri Vinay Kumar Diwan. He was also known as Denva Ke Gandhi for his work for public welfare. He was a public representative in the region for almost two decades serving as MLA. But, while the Dam was being built, the oustees were not resettled properly. They were given only Rs. 75 - 150 for an acre of land and were resettled just on higher ground without the adequate supplies that were promised by the Indian Government.

Over the years, the oustees lost its fishing rights. The Government took over fishing rights indefinitely. Later, the private sector got hold of the rights and threatened to kill the villagers. They fished recklessly to maximise their profits, while also policing the reservoir with hired bodyguards. So, a self-help co-operative was formed by the oustees. It was called the Tawa Matsya Sangh. They later got fishing rights and sustainably regrew the fish population that was destroyed by corporate companies, along with making a bit of profit for the benefit of the members.

Ironically, the group had to pay Rs. 12 lakh to the Govt to fish on their own land each year. Later, in 2006, the Government snatched away the rights due to its growing commercial importance. Later, a Government reserve took over the rights to protect the fish.

Enraged, the oustees fought for their rights in the Supreme Court, citing that they grew the fish there and had been sustainably fishing there for about a decade. Eventually, they lost the case and now the Tawa Reserve is protected from poaching.

It is now currently a popular tourist destination during the monsoon months. A cruise boat service has been started by the tourism department for visitors to the dam and reservoir.

References

Lakes of Madhya Pradesh
Reservoirs in India
Dams in Madhya Pradesh
Tourist attractions in Narmadapuram district
1978 establishments in Madhya Pradesh
Dams completed in 1978
20th-century architecture in India